Momo Latiff (1921 - 10 December 2015) was a popular Malay-language Singaporean singer of the 1950's and 1960s. Her successful songs included "Pantai Chinta Berahi" ("PCB" beach, now Pantai Cahaya Bulan) to the music of pianist Dodo Mallinger. Originally a dancer, she was contracted as singer by Shaw Brothers for films such as Hang Tuah (1955) and Semerah Padi (1956).

References

1921 births
2015 deaths